Yemi Idowu, or Adeyemi Idowu, (born 3 December 1968) is a Nigerian entrepreneur, industrialist and philanthropist.

Early life and education
An alumnus of the Harvard Business School Executive Education Program, Idowu holds a Bachelor of Science in Accounts and Financial Analysis from the Newcastle upon Tyne University, England.

Business career and sports
Yemi Idowu is an accomplished businessman having served on the board of various companies. Idowu founded Aircom Nigeria Limited in 1992 and serves as the Managing Director till date.

Until July 2014, Idowu served as a non-executive Director with Sterling Bank (Nigeria) PLC from its inception in 2005 and was a onetime Chairman of Sterling Capital  as well as being the Vice Chairman of NBM Bank between 1999 and 2005.

Idowu also sat on the governing council of the Bank Directors Association of Nigeria (BDAN)  as its General Secretary between 2009 and 2014. Idowu also serves as Chairman Leyland Nigeria (Nigeria’s largest indigenous automobile assembly plant) and is a Director of the Lagos Junior League and the current Chairman of Nathaniel Boys Football Club   where the likes of Leicester City F.C. midfield maestro Wilfred Ndidi who played for Genk in the Belgian Pro League started their careers from.

In his capacity as Chairman of the board of NASCOM, Yemi Idowu was instrumental in initiating the Rhythm N' Play campaign  - a grassroot sports mobilization campaign targeted at bringing an additional 2 million Nigeria school children into sports within a two-year period. Former Nigerian President Goodluck Jonathan launched the campaign in Abuja on 6 June 2013.

Idowu is involved in infrastructure sustainability and security as tools to developing and sustaining Mega cities in Africa and on 10 November 2015 he was appointed a member of the Board of Trustees of the Lagos State Security Trust Fund   alongside Herbert Wigwe, Opeyemi Agbaje, Gbolahan Lawal and Phillip Oduozua by his Excellency Akinwunmi Ambode the Lagos State Governor.

in May 2022, Yemi Idowu through his foundation The Nathaniel Idowu Foundation funded and facilitated the development of the new Maracana Modern Sports complex in Ajegunle, Lagos State.

References
13. https://thenationonlineng.net/yemi-idowu-journey-to-new-look-maracana-stadium/

14. https://www.thisdaylive.com/index.php/2022/05/09/nff-hails-idowu-as-youngsters-ignite-maracana-stadium/

1968 births
Living people
Nigerian businesspeople
Nigerian philanthropists